Bruno Visintin (23 November 1932 – 11 January 2015) was a boxer from Italy. He was born in La Spezia, Italy. Visintin was a Light Welterweight (140 lb/63.5 kg) Olympic Bronze Medalist at the 1952 Helsinki Olympics. He died at the age of 82 in January 2015 at a hospital in La Spezia.

1952 Olympic results
Below is the record of Bruno Visintin, an Italian light welterweight boxer who competed at the 1952 Helsinki Olympics:

 Round of 32: defeated Ernesto Porto (Philippines) by a second-round knockout
 Round of 16: defeated Juan Curet Alvarez (Puerto Rico) by decision, 3-0
 Quarterfinal: defeated Terence Milligan (Ireland) by decision, 3-0
 Semifinal: lost to Charles Adkins ((United States) by decision, 0-3 (was awarded bronze medal)

References

External links

1932 births
2015 deaths
Boxers at the 1952 Summer Olympics
Olympic boxers of Italy
Olympic bronze medalists for Italy
Olympic medalists in boxing
Italian male boxers
Medalists at the 1952 Summer Olympics
Mediterranean Games gold medalists for Italy
Mediterranean Games medalists in boxing
Boxers at the 1951 Mediterranean Games
Light-welterweight boxers